Saint Jerome in Penitence is a c. 1552 painting by Titian.

References

1552 paintings
Paintings in the collection of the Pinacoteca di Brera
Religious paintings by Titian
Titian, 1552
Lions in art
Skulls in art